Family with sequence similarity 173 member A is a protein that in humans is encoded by the FAM173A gene.

References

Further reading